The 2014 ICC World Twenty20 was the fifth ICC World Twenty20 competition, an international Twenty20 cricket tournament, that took place in Bangladesh from 16 March to 6 April 2014. It was played in three cities — Dhaka, Chittagong and Sylhet. The International Cricket Council announced Bangladesh as host in 2010. It was the second consecutive time that an Asian country is hosting this event, as Sri Lanka hosted the previous tournament in 2012. Sri Lanka won the tournament, beating India by 6 wickets in the final at Mirpur.

Format
During Group Stage points were awarded to the teams as follows:

In the event of teams finishing on equal points in their group, the following tie-breakers were applied to determine their order in the table in the following order of priority: most wins, higher net run rate, head-to-head record in matches involving the tied teams.

Teams
For the first time, the tournament featured 16 teams. All ten full members qualified automatically, joined by the six associate members that qualified through the 2013 ICC World Twenty20 Qualifier. The qualifying teams are Ireland, Afghanistan, Netherlands and making their World Twenty20 debut the UAE, Nepal and Hong Kong.

The first round consisted of 8 teams and 2 teams moved to next round. Second round was the Super 10 stage which consisted of 2 groups of 5 teams each. The top eight Full Member nations in the ICC T20I Championship rankings as of 8 October 2012 automatically progressed to the Super 10 stage of 2014 ICC World Twenty20.

Joining the eight full members in the super 10 stage was host nation Bangladesh (also a full member) and associate nation The Netherlands who topped their first round group by net run rate ahead of Test playing nation Zimbabwe and Ireland.

Match officials
The match referees’ responsibilities throughout the tournament were shared between four members of the Elite Panel of ICC Referees:

  David Boon
  Javagal Srinath
  Ranjan Madugalle
  Roshan Mahanama

The on-field responsibilities for officiating the tournament were shared by all 11 of the Elite Panel of ICC Umpires and 3 umpires from the International Panel of Umpires and Referees:

Australia
  Steve Davis
  Bruce Oxenford
  Paul Reiffel
  Rod Tucker

England
  Ian Gould
  Richard Illingworth
  Nigel Llong
  Richard Kettleborough

India
  Sundaram Ravi

New Zealand
  Billy Bowden

Pakistan
  Aleem Dar

South Africa
  Marais Erasmus

Sri Lanka
  Kumar Dharmasena
  Ranmore Martinesz

Squads

Venues
Thirty-one matches were played at three venues in Dhaka, Chittagong and Sylhet.

Warm-up matches
16 warm-up matches were played between 12 and 19 March featuring all 16 teams.

First stage

Group A 

 Advanced to Super 10

Group B 

 Advanced to Super 10

Super 10

Group 1 

 Advanced to Knockout stage.

Group 2 

 Advanced to Knockout stage.

Knockout stage

Semi-finals

Final

Statistics

Most runs
Source: Cricinfo

Most wickets
Source: Cricinfo

Team of the tournament

Media

Logo
On 6 April 2013, ICC unveiled the logo of the tournament at a gala event in Dhaka. The overall look of the logo design is primarily inspired by the unique Bangladesh decoration art style. The logo uses the colours of the Bangladeshi flag with splashes of blue representing the country's rivers (also as being the ICC's own colour). The logo is also inspired by the rickshaws. The T is made up of cricket stumps and the '0' in the T20 represents the cricket ball complete with a green seam.

Theme song

The official theme song for the 2014 ICC World Twenty20 Char Chokka Hoi Hoi was released on 20 February 2014. It was composed by Fuad al Muqtadir and sung by Dilshad Nahar Kona, Dilshad Karim Elita, Pantha Konai, Johan Alamgir, Sanvir Huda, Badhon Sarkar Puja and Kaushik Hossain Taposh. The song received widespread popularity among the Bangladeshi youth as well as the Bangladeshi diaspora abroad and gave birth to a new trend of flashmobs in the major cities of Bangladesh.

Broadcasting

See also
 2014 ICC Women's World Twenty20

Notes

References

External links
 ICC World Twenty20 - Official website
 ICC World T20 2014 coverage on Wisden India
 ICC World T20 2014 coverage on ESPNCricinfo 

 
ICC World Twenty20
International cricket competitions in 2014
Cricket
ICC Men's T20 World Cup
ICC World Twenty20
ICC World Twenty20